The  Los Angeles Kiss season was the third and final season for the arena football franchise in the Arena Football League. The team was coached by Omarr Smith and played their home games at Honda Center.

Standings

Schedule

Regular season
The 2016 regular season schedule was released on December 10, 2015.

Playoffs

Roster

References

Los Angeles Kiss
Los Angeles Kiss seasons
Los Angeles Kiss